The Wyoming Wildcat is a 1925 American silent Western film directed by Robert De Lacey and starring Tom Tyler, Billie Bennett, and Frankie Darro.

Plot
As described in a film magazine review, Phil Stone, a young cowboy, makes two enemies by rescuing a boy and his dog from an evil pair of ranchers, and, after he goes to work on a ranch owned by a Blendy Betts, the enemies begin operations. There follows a period of peril during which both hero and heroine nearly lose their lives. When Blendy is kidnapped and ends up in the river, Phil comes to her rescue. In the end, the desperate pair of scheming rancers are defeated and the young woman ranch owner and her employee are married.

Cast

References

Bibliography
 Darby, William (1991). Masters of Lens and Light: A Checklist of Major Cinematographers and Their Feature Films. Scarecrow Press.

External links
 

1925 films
1925 Western (genre) films
Films directed by Robert De Lacey
1920s English-language films
American black-and-white films
Film Booking Offices of America films
Silent American Western (genre) films
1920s American films